The 2021 Stamford mayoral election was held on November 2, 2021. Incumbent Democratic mayor David Martin sought re-election to a third term in office, but lost renomination to state representative Caroline Simmons. Simmons, who was also endorsed by the Independent Party, faced unaffiliated candidate Bobby Valentine.

Initial results indicated Simmons had a slight lead over Valentine. Absentee ballots swung heavily in Simmons' favor resulting in a 5-point lead over Valentine. Following her election, Simmons became Stamford's first female mayor.

Democratic primary
On July 25, the Stamford City Committee narrowly voted to endorse Simmons over the incumbent Martin, with 21 members voting for Simmons and 19 voting for Martin. Shortly thereafter, Martin declared his intention to continue with his candidacy and force a primary. According to the Connecticut Secretary of State, Martin was required to collect 1,550 signatures, 5 percent of the total number of registered Democrats in the city. Martin collected over 3,000 signatures, guaranteeing a Democratic Primary.

The primary was held on September 14. The ballot also included elections for the Stamford Board of Representative District 5, and Stamford Board of Representative District 19. Simmons won in a landslide, earning a majority of support in all of city's 20 voting districts. Martin conceded the night of the primary and endorsed Simmons.

Democrats

Nominee
Caroline Simmons, state representative (endorsed by Stamford Democratic City Committee, won primary)

Eliminated in Primary
David Martin, incumbent mayor (endorsed Simmons)

Declined
Christopher Malloy, former member of the Stamford Democratic Committee and nephew of former mayor and former Governor of Connecticut Dannel Malloy (endorsed Simmons)

Results

Republican endorsement 
The Republican Stamford City Committee endorsed Joe Corsello as its mayoral candidate. However, he withdrew from the race on September 8 and endorsed Bobby Valentine.

Withdrew
Joe Corsello, drummer and retired police detective

Independent endorsement 
The Independent Party of Connecticut endorsed Caroline Simmons for mayor in August 2021.

Endorsed candidate
Caroline Simmons, state representative

Unaffiliated

Declared
Bobby Valentine, former baseball player and manager and former Stamford Director of Public Safety  Valentine's candidacy has increased outside media scrutiny which included coverage of Valentine accidentally uploading a Cameo video that included him not picking up after one of his dogs pooped in a neighbor's yard.  Valentine disputed that he recalls ever having failed to pick up after his dog.

Fundraising

Democratic Primary

Caroline Simmons

Bobby Valentine

General election

Public Debates

Results

Notes

References

2021
Stamford
Stamford